Nokesville Truss Bridge is a historic Pratt truss bridge carrying Virginia State Route 646 (Aden Road) across the Norfolk Southern Railway near Nokesville, Prince William County, Virginia. It was built in 1882 by the Keystone Bridge Company.

The bridge was added to the National Register of Historic Places in 1978.

See also
List of bridges documented by the Historic American Engineering Record in Virginia
List of bridges on the National Register of Historic Places in Virginia

References

External links

Buildings and structures in Prince William County, Virginia
Bridges completed in 1882
Road bridges on the National Register of Historic Places in Virginia
National Register of Historic Places in Prince William County, Virginia
Historic American Engineering Record in Virginia
Wrought iron bridges in the United States
Pratt truss bridges in the United States